Sandford is an English language toponymic surname, deriving from numerous localities named for a sandy ford.

St Fort in Fife, originally Sandforde or Sandford, is a Scottish origin of the name.

Notable Sandfords
 Alexander Wallace Sandford Australian businessman and politician
 Ben Sandford (born 1979), skeleton racer from New Zealand
 Chris Sandford (born 1939), English actor and writer on fly-fishing
 Christopher Sandford (1902–1983), Anglo-Irish private press owner, father of Jeremy Sandford
 Christopher Sandford (biographer) (born 1956), English journalist and biographer
 Daniel Fox Sandford (1831–1906), Bishop of Tasmania from 1883 until 1889
 Daniel Sandford (journalist), BBC Home Affairs Correspondent
 Daniel Sandford (bishop of Edinburgh), (1766–1830), Bishop of Edinburgh
 Daniel Sandford (soldier), (1882–1972), British army Brigadier, later, advisor to Haile Selassie I of Ethiopia
 Elliott Sandford (1840–1897), Chief Justice of the Supreme Court of the Utah Territory
 Francis Sandford, 1st Baron Sandford (1824–1893), British civil servant and Baron Sandford
 Frank Sandford (1862–1948), the founder of "The Kingdom", a christian cult
 Frankie Sandford (born 1989), British singer: S Club 8, The Saturdays
 Gladys Sandford (1891–1971) first licensed woman pilot in New Zealand
 James T. Sandford, American politician
 Sir James Wallace Sandford (1879–1958), Australian businessman and politician, son of Alexander Wallace Sandford
 Jeremy Sandford (1930–2003), English television writer, musician and visionary
 John de Sandford (died 1294), archbishop of Dublin
 John Sandford (novelist) (born 1944), American journalist and novelist
 Kenneth Sandford (1924–2004), English singer and actor
 Lettice Sandford (1902–1993), draftsman, wood-engraver, and watercolourist, mother of Jeremy Sandford
 Richard Sandford (died 1918), English recipient of the Victoria Cross
 Robert Sandford (explorer), English explorer of Carolina coast
 Roc Sandford (born 1957), English owner of Gometra island, son of Jeremy Sandford
 Teddy Sandford (1910–1995), English footballer
 Thomas Sandford (1762–1808), American soldier and politician
 Tiny Sandford (1894–1961), burly actor who starred in Laurel and Hardy and Charlie Chaplin films

See also
 Khalifa St. Fort
 Sandford (disambiguation)
 Sanford (surname)

References 

Surnames of English origin
Surnames of Lowland Scottish origin
English toponymic surnames